John Wheeler was an American educator, the second principal of Baldwin Institute and the first president of Baldwin University in Berea, Ohio. Baldwin College would eventually merge with nearby German Wallace College to become Baldwin–Wallace College. Wheeler has a building named after him on the Baldwin Wallace University campus.

Biography

Life 
Dr. John Wheeler was born in Portsmouth, England on April 7, 1815. In 1820 his family moved to America and settled in Bellefontaine, Ohio. In 1824 Wheeler joined the Methodist Church and eventually jointed the Norwalk Seminary in 1835. He attended Allegheny College from 1837-1839 and eventually Indiana Asbury University until 1840. Once leaving Asbury University he became principal of Franklin Institute in Indianapolis, Indiana. While there he married Mary Yandes. The two had had seven children. In 1842 he left Franklin to teach Latin at Asbury until 1854.

Baldwin Institute 

In 1855, Wheeler became the 2nd principal for the recently established Baldwin Institute (1846) founded by John Baldwin. He became first president of Baldwin College in 1855, and during his presidency, his wife, Mary Yandes died. In addition, Wheeler assisted in the establishment of a German department with James Wallace which eventually established German Wallace College on 7 June 1864.

Later Years 
Wheeler left Baldwin University in 1870 to become president of Iowa Wesleyan University now called Iowa Wesleyan College. Wheeler served at the First Methodist Church in Keokuk, Iowa and eventually moved to Mount Pleasant, Iowa where he died on June 18, 1881.

Legacy

Wheeler assisted in the establishment of the German Department at Baldwin Institute. This department led to the eventual development of German Wallace College. Eventually due to financial difficulty of both schools, German Wallace and Baldwin University would become Baldwin-Wallace College. Today Baldwin-Wallace College now is Baldwin Wallace University.

In 1872, Hulet Hall (named after Hulet's wife) was built using Berea sandstone, at an original cost of $10,000. Hulet was eventually torn down in 1972. Recitation Hall was built in 1891 (now called Wheeler Hall); the ground-breaking ceremony was led by Mary Baldwin, John's daughter. Wheeler hall is named after John Wheeler. Wheeler Hall is located on the Universities' north part of campus near Baldwin Library.

On December 1, 1978, John Wheeler's Home located on 445 S. Rocky River Dr. in Berea Ohio was added to the National Register of Historic Places.

Notes

References 
 Baldwin, Charles Candee. Baldwin Genealogy, 1880.
 Clary, Norman J. Baldwin–Wallace College. Cradles of Conscience. Ed. John Wiliam Oliver, Jr. Kent State University Press, 2003. 39–51 

1815 births
1881 deaths
Methodists from Indiana
Presidents of Baldwin Wallace University
English-American culture in Ohio
People from Bellefontaine, Ohio
English emigrants to the United States
Methodists from Ohio
Methodists from Iowa